Sindi is a town in Tori Parish, in Pärnu County, Estonia, with a population of 3906 in 2017. It is located 14 kilometers from the county capital Pärnu, on the left coast of the Pärnu River.

History
In the area of Sindi was the Mesolithic settlement of Pulli, dating from around 8500 BC - the oldest known settlement in Estonia. It was discovered by geologists in 1965. The settlement probably existed for a short period, as the area was later covered by water. As a swampy region, the area remained unpopulated until the 16th century.

The town's name is derived from Clauss Zindt, a mayor of Pärnu in 1565, who founded a manor (Zintenhof) where the town is now. The settlement was formed in 1833 around a textile factory owned by the manor. It officially became a borough in 1921 and a town in 1938.

Important to the town's development was the founding of a railway station 1928. The railway operated until 1970.

Geography
Sindi is located on the left bank of Pärnu River, between the river and the wetland of Lanksaare.

Notable people
Uno Palu (born 1933), decathlete
Allar Raja (born 1983), rower
Julius Seljamaa (1883–1936), politician and diplomat
The Tuberkuloited, rock band originally from Sindi

Gallery

References

External links 
  

Cities and towns in Estonia
Former municipalities of Estonia
Populated places in Pärnu County
Kreis Pernau